A hypohalous acid is an oxyacid consisting of a hydroxyl group single-bonded to any halogen. Examples include hypofluorous acid, hypochlorous acid, hypobromous acid, and hypoiodous acid. The conjugate base is a hypohalite. They can be formed by reacting the corresponding diatomic halogen molecule with water in the reaction:

This also results in the corresponding hydrogen halide, which is also acidic.

Stability
Hypohalous acids tend to be unstable. Only hypofluorous acid has been isolated as a solid, and even it is explosive at room temperature. Hypochlorous acid cannot be prepared in anhydrous form. Hypobromous acid, hypoiodous acid, and their conjugate bases (hypobromite and hypoiodite) are also unstable, undergoing disproportionation reactions like

and

that result in the corresponding hydrogen halides/halide ions and halic acids/halates.

Uses
Hypochlorous acid and hypobromous acid are each dissolved in water in order to sanitize it, hypochlorous acid in swimming pools and hypobromous acid in hot tubs and spas.

Acidity
Hypohalous acids tend to be weak acids, and they tend to get weaker as the halogen progresses farther down the periodic table. Hypochlorous acid has a pKa of 7.53. The pKa values of hypobromous acid is higher (meaning that it is an even weaker acid), at 8.65. The pKa of hypoiodous acid is even higher, at 10.6.

References

Halogen oxoacids